Nicolas "Nicky" Torres (born June 1, 1987, in Miami, Florida) is an Argentine footballer.

Career

Club
Torres began his career playing in Argentina with the youth academy of Deportivo Español. 
Debuted at age 18 in Deportivo Español and played several games as a starter and coming on as a substitute.

In June 2008, Torres signed with Argentino de Merlo of the Argentine Primera C Metropolitana.

He returned to the United States in 2008. He signed with Miami FC of the USL First Division on April 13, 2009. He made his professional debut on April 26, 2009, coming on as a substitute in Miami's game against Rochester Rhinos.

In 2010, he signed with Bolivian club Jorge Wilstermann.

International
Torres played with United States U-20 team pool in 2006.

References

1987 births
Living people
American soccer players
Miami FC (2006) players
Soccer players from Florida
C.D. Jorge Wilstermann players
United States men's under-20 international soccer players
Argentino de Merlo footballers
Association football midfielders
American people of Argentine descent